Pay Taft may refer to:
 Pay Taft Jalil